Amazon Elastic File System (Amazon EFS) is a cloud storage service provided by Amazon Web Services (AWS) designed to provide scalable, elastic, concurrent with some restrictions, and encrypted file storage for use with both AWS cloud services and on-premises resources. Amazon EFS is built to be able to grow  and shrink automatically as files are added and removed. Amazon EFS supports Network File System (NFS) versions 4.0 and 4.1 (NFSv4) protocol, and control access to files through Portable Operating System Interface (POSIX) permissions.

Use cases 
According to Amazon, use cases for this file system service typically include content repositories, development environments, web server farms, home directories and big data applications.

Data consistency 
Amazon EFS provides open-after-close consistency semantics that applications expect from NFS.

Availability 
Amazon EFS is available in all the public AWS regions at least since December 2019.

See also 
 GlusterFS
 Red Hat Storage Server

References

External links 

 Amazon Elastic File System

AWS training institute in Madhapur Hyderabad

Elastic File System
Cloud infrastructure
Cloud platforms
Distributed data storage
Cloud storage
Distributed file systems